Sethos is the nom de guerre of the shadowy "Master Criminal" in the Amelia Peabody series of historical mystery novels.

Role in the novels
He is first encountered in The Mummy Case, as the mastermind of an organized gang of thieves attempting to steal antiquities from Dahshoor, in which he is partially foiled by Amelia Peabody and her husband, Radcliffe Emerson. To their surprise, he reveals that he has spent most of the novel right under their noses, pretending to be a Coptic priest of the local village. Despite his disguise, Amelia feels sure he is English in origin.

In Lion in the Valley, his nom de guerre is revealed, and he is thus described by an Englishman who hears of him during his brief foray into slum life: 

"He has no name, only a variety of appellations. Those in his employ, I believe, refer to him as the Master. To others, less intimately associated with him, he is known as Sethos... The men who work for the Master are the cream of the criminal crop. To be chosen by him is a mark of honor. Even those who are not in his employ are in deadly terror of him, and it is said that his revenge on a traitor is swift and horrible." (LITV, chapter 5)

Amelia becomes obsessed with the idea of apprehending the Master Criminal and putting a stop to his activities. By the end of Lion in the Valley she is captured by Sethos, but astonished when he professes to be passionately in love with her. Amelia is starting to believe that she may be able to reform him when Emerson bursts in and fights with Sethos, who manages to escape. After realizing that he cannot have her, he promises never to harm or threaten her or her family.

He reappears in the novels from time to time, often to rescue Amelia from other foes. Despite her  occasional entreaties, he never gives up his illegal activities, which he takes considerable pride in. 

He is presumed dead at the end of The Snake, the Crocodile, and the Dog and again at the end of He Shall Thunder in the Sky, at which point it is revealed that he has been working for British Intelligence during the Great War.

Family
It is revealed in He Shall Thunder in the Sky that "Sethos" is actually Emerson and Walter's half-brother, the illegitimate son of their father and his mistress, who had been their mother's best friend. He spent his childhood hating Emerson for having the recognition and childhood he craved, not knowing that Emerson spent his own childhood loathing his situation and searching for a way to remove Walter and himself from their mother's grasp.

Sethos eventually takes a wife, Margaret Minton, a female reporter (who bears a striking resemblance to Amelia). His other family includes a grown daughter, Maryam, from a previous relationship with partner-in-crime Bertha, and eventually a grandchild, Maryam's son from her first marriage.

Names
In Children of the Storm, he reveals to Evelyn Emerson that Seth is in fact his real name. 

His pseudonym is thought to be a pun on the mythological Set, a god of Egypt who attempted to kill his brother Osiris. The rivalry of Sethos and Radcliffe is probably a parody of Set's feud with Osiris, and Sethos' redemption a parody of Set's transformation into a god of storm by Ra.

Abilities
Sethos possesses a superior intellect, exceptional strength and agility, and a great deal of charisma. He is an extremely capable fighter, but always prefers to anticipate and outthink his adversaries. In Lord of the Silent, his own nephew Ramses Emerson reflects with frustration that, whether he is on the Emersons' side or against them, it is nearly impossible to catch him in a situation where he's not one or two steps ahead of them.

His most prominent talent is that he is a master of disguise and an amazingly talented mimic. Even Amelia, who claims that she would know him anywhere, sometimes has trouble recognizing him. In Lion in the Valley he admits to appearing to the Emersons in three vastly different roles: a young, vacuous English nobleman, a middle-aged private investigator, and an elderly and obnoxious American female tourist.  More impressively, in the course of The Snake, the Crocodile, and the Dog he spends several months by Amelia's side in the guise of the Emersons' close friend, Cyrus Vandergelt, with Amelia none the wiser.

In Lion, Ramses acquires part of his collection and becomes quite adept at the art of disguise himself.

Characters in the Amelia Peabody novel series